Vaishnav College may refer to:

 DG Vaishnav College
 M.O.P. Vaishnav College for Women